The men's 200 metres T12 took place in Stadium Australia.

There were five heats, two semifinals and one final. The T12 is for athletes who have a visual impairment.

Heats

Heat 1

Heat 2

Heat 3

Heat 4

Heat 5

Semifinals

Heat 1

Heat 2

Final

References

Athletics at the 2000 Summer Paralympics